Kamalasai is a district (amphoe) in the southern part of Kalasin province, northeastern Thailand.

Geography
Neighboring districts are (from the west clockwise): Khong Chai, Mueang Kalasin, Don Chan of Kalasin Province, Pho Chai of Roi Et province, Rong Kham of Kalasin Province, and Changhan of Roi Et province.

Administration

Central administration 
Kamalasai is divided into eight sub-districts (tambons), which are further subdivided into 111 administrative villages (mubans).

Missing numbers are tambon which now form Khong Chai District.

Local administration 
There are five sub-district municipalities (thesaban tambons) in the district:
 Kamalasai consisting of parts of sub-districts Kamalasai and Lak Mueang.
 Thanya consisting of parts of sub-district Thanya.
 Nong Paen consisting of the sub-district Nong Paen.
 Lak Mueang consisting of parts of sub-district Lak Mueang.
 Dong Ling consisting of sub-district Dong Ling.

There are five sub-district administrative organizations (SAO) in the district:
 Kamalasai consisting of parts of sub-district Kamalasai.
 Phon Ngam consisting of the sub-district Phon Ngam.
 Thanya consisting of parts of sub-district Thanya.
 Chao Tha consisting of the sub-district Chao Tha.
 Khok Sombun consisting of the sub-district Khok Sombun.

References

External links
amphoe.com (Thai)

Kamalasai